Davie County is a county located in the U.S. state of North Carolina. As of the 2020 census, the population was 42,712. Its county seat is Mocksville.

Davie County is included in the Winston-Salem, NC Metropolitan Statistical Area, which is also included in the Greensboro-Winston-Salem-High Point, NC Combined Statistical Area.

History
The county was formed in 1836 from Rowan County.  It was named for William R. Davie, Governor of North Carolina from 1798 to 1799.

Davie County was initially strongly Unionist. However, 1,147 soldiers from Davie County fought in the American Civil War for the Confederate States of America.

Geography

Major water bodies 
 Bear Creek
 Buffalo Creek
 Carter Creek
 Chinquapin Creek
 Dutchman Creek
 Greasy Creek
 Little Bear Creek
 Little Creek
 South Yadkin River
 Sugar Creek
 Yadkin River

Adjacent counties
 Yadkin County - north
 Forsyth County - northeast
 Davidson County - east
 Rowan County - south
 Iredell County - west

Major highways

Demographics

2020 census

As of the 2020 United States census, there were 42,712 people, 16,405 households, and 11,586 families residing in the county.

2000 census
As of the census of 2000, there were 34,835 people, 13,750 households, and 10,257 families residing in the county.  The population density was 131 people per square mile (51/km2).  There were 14,953 housing units at an average density of 56 per square mile (22/km2).  The racial makeup of the county was 90.44% White, 6.80% Black or African American, 0.23% Native American, 0.31% Asian, 0.02% Pacific Islander, 1.31% from other races, and 0.89% from two or more races.  3.47% of the population were Hispanic or Latino of any race.

There were 13,750 households, out of which 32.70% had children under the age of 18 living with them, 61.40% were married couples living together, 9.20% had a female householder with no husband present, and 25.40% were non-families. 22.20% of all households were made up of individuals, and 9.70% had someone living alone who was 65 years of age or older.  The average household size was 2.51 and the average family size was 2.91.

In the county, the population was well distributed by age, with 24.30% under the age of 18, 7.10% from 18 to 24, 29.40% from 25 to 44, 25.50% from 45 to 64, and 13.80% who were 65 years of age or older.  The median age was 38 years. For every 100 females there were 97.00 males.  For every 100 females age 18 and over, there were 94.00 males.

The median income for a household in the county was $40,174, and the median income for a family was $47,699. Males had a median income of $33,179 versus $24,632 for females. The per capita income for the county was $21,359.  About 6.40% of families and 8.60% of the population were below the poverty line, including 10.20% of those under age 18 and 11.30% of those age 65 or over.

Government and politics

Davie is a strongly Republican county, being one of seven North Carolina counties to be won by Alf Landon in 1936, and one of thirteen to be carried by Barry Goldwater in 1964. The only Democrat to win the county since World War I has been Franklin D. Roosevelt in 1940, when he was aided by support for Britain's World War II effort by the county's population – which is predominantly of British ancestry.

Davie County is a member of the Piedmont Triad Regional Council. In the North Carolina Senate, it is in the 31st Senate district, represented by Republican Joyce Krawiec. In the North Carolina House of Representatives, Davie County is in the 79th district represented by Republican Julia C. Howard.

Yadkin Valley wine region 
Portions of Davie County are located in the Yadkin Valley AVA, an American Viticultural Area. Wines made from grapes grown in the Yadkin Valley AVA may use the appellation Yadkin Valley on their labels.

Communities

Towns
 Bermuda Run
 Cooleemee
 Mocksville (county seat and largest town)

Townships
By the requirements of the North Carolina Constitution of 1868, all counties in North Carolina were divided into townships.   The townships have been used in U.S. Census enumerations since 1870.  The following townships were created in 1868:
 Calahaln Township
 Clarksville Township
 Farmington Township
 Fulton Township
 Jerusalem Township
 Mocksville Township
 Shady Grove Township

Unincorporated communities
 Cornatzer
 Farmington
 Hillsdale
 Maine
 Sheffield
 Turkeyfoot

Census-designated place
 Advance

Post offices
Through 1971, there were only three continuing U.S. post offices in Davie County: 
Advances (since February 16, 1877)
Cooleeme (since February 9, 1900)
Mocksville (since January 4, 1830, created in Rowan County until Davie County was formed)

See also
 List of counties in North Carolina
 National Register of Historic Places listings in Davie County, North Carolina

References

External links

 
 
 Davie County Chamber and Tourism
 Digital Davie: Historic Photos and Documents from the Davie County Public Library
 Sisters Pen Book on Civil War History

 
1836 establishments in North Carolina
Populated places established in 1836
Counties of Appalachia